This is a list of all lighthouses in the U.S. state of Louisiana.

Notes
A. The abandoned tower remained until 2002 when it toppled over.
B. In 2005, Hurricane Katrina caused significant damage to the lighthouse. New Canal Light eventually collapsed the following year and was rebuilt/relit by 2012.
C. The jetty that the front light was on has since disappeared. The front light was either removed by human or by nature.
D. The first tower was built in 1832 and collapsed in 1837. The second tower which still stands today was built in 1839 and deactivated after the civil war. The third tower also still stands today and was built in 1871 as a skeletal steel structure. This steel lighthouse lasted until 1965 when a fourth modern tower took its place. In 2007, the 1965 structure was demolished and a new small skeletal metal tower mounted atop a platform stands today.

References 

Louisiana
 
Lighthouses
Lighthouses